Brian D. Beaudreault (born 1960) is a retired United States Marine Corps lieutenant general who most recently served as commander of II Marine Expeditionary Force. He previously served as the Deputy Commandant for Plans, Policies, and Operations and Commanding General, 2nd Marine Division.

Marine Corps career
Beaudreault was commissioned as a second lieutenant in 1983, after graduating from the University of Massachusetts, Amherst. He graduated from The Basic School and was assigned to 1st Battalion, 3rd Marines as rifle platoon commander and company executive officer. His next assignment was 2nd Battalion, 9th Marines where he served as Assistant Operations Officer, Logistics Officer, Maritime Special Purpose Force Commander and Company Commander. He deployed with 15th Marine Expeditionary Unit during Operation Restore Hope in Somalia. He served a brief tour as Guard Officer, Marine Corps Security Force Company, Naval Station Roosevelt Roads.  As a field grade officer, Beaudreault graduated from the Amphibious Warfare School and later served as Operations Officer with 31st Marine Expeditionary Unit. After promotion to lieutenant colonel, Beaudreault received assignment as Commanding Officer of 1st Battalion, 1st Marines, 13th Marine Expeditionary Unit and deployed to Iraq during Operation Iraqi Freedom. As a colonel, Beaudreault was assigned as Commanding Officer, 15th Marine Expeditionary Unit and deployed a second time during Operation Iraqi Freedom.

Beaudreault's staff and joint duty assignments include Inspector-Instructor, 3rd Battalion, 23rd Marines; student, United States Army Command and General Staff College; Executive Officer, 1st Marine Regiment; student, Naval War College; Ground Plans Officer, Operations Directorate, United States Central Command; student, Higher Command and Staff Course, Defence Academy of the United Kingdom; Deputy Director, Future Joint Force Development, Joint Staff (J7); Director, Expeditionary Warfare School. As a general officer Beaudreault served as Commanding General, 2nd Marine Division from August 2014 to June 2016; Director of Operations and Cyber (J3), United States Africa Command; Deputy Commander, Marine Forces Central Command and Commander MARCENT (Forward); and Commanding General, II Marine Expeditionary Force from July 13, 2019 to July 8, 2021.

He retired after relinquishing command of II MEF to William Jurney on July 8, 2021 after 38 years of service, participating in a retirement ceremony presided by Assistant Commandant of the Marine Corps Gary L. Thomas.

References

1960 births
Living people
Recipients of the Defense Superior Service Medal
Recipients of the Legion of Merit
United States Marine Corps generals
United States Marine Corps personnel of the Gulf War
United States Marine Corps personnel of the Iraq War
University of Massachusetts Amherst alumni